Clube Desportivo dos Serviços de Alfândega is a Macanese football club which currently competes in the Liga de Elite.

Squad 2011

Football clubs in Macau
1998 establishments in Macau
Works association football teams